Captain Robert Bennet Forbes (September 18, 1804 – November 23, 1889), was an American sea captain, China merchant and ship owner. He was active in ship construction, maritime safety, the opium trade, and charitable activities, including food aid to Ireland, which became known as America's first major disaster relief effort.

Early life

He was born in 1804 in Jamaica Plain, Boston, Massachusetts, to Ralph Bennet Forbes and Margaret Perkins, sister of the trader in slaves and China opium, Thomas Perkins. His brothers were Thomas Tunno and John Murray.

On October 19, 1817, at age 13, he joined the crew on his uncle Thomas' Canton Packet and made his first voyage to China, the first of the three brothers to do so. He arrived in Canton, China in March 1818 via the eastern route. He returned to Boston three months later.

In 1819, he made a second voyage aboard Canton Packet. On this voyage, he was promoted to third mate. He became second mate in 1821.

Ships' command and Far East trade
Aboard Nile he sailed for Manila. He had been ship's master of Levant. He became a full captain in 1825. From Manila Nile went to China, then to California, and from there to Buenos Aires.

In 1828 he sailed Danube for Sturgis & Perkins on a trading voyage to Smyrna, Turkey, and other European ports.

When Russell & Company were merged with his uncle's Turkish opium trading firm in 1830, Forbes was placed in command of their opium storehouse vessel Lintin which was moored permanently at the Pearl River estuary island after which it was named. His work in supervising the repacking of the opium and negotiating trades with drug smugglers made him his first fortune. From his ample means he made generous provision for his mother and younger brother. He visited China several times and became the American vice-consul at Canton.

In 1834 he married Rose Greene Smith and they had three children: Robert Bennet Forbes (1837-1891), Edith Forbes who married Charles Eliot Perkins, and James Murray Forbes (1845-1885).

In 1841 he witnessed the Battle of Kowloon between the Qing Dynasty and the British Empire from aboard his rowboat.

He died on November 23, 1889 in Milton, Massachusetts.

Ships
Forbes owned or was involved in the construction of approximately seventy vessels.

His first ship was Lintin, a 390-ton bark built by Sprague and James in Medford, Massachusetts, in 1830. Forbes owned Lintin from 1830–1832, after which time she sailed in Chinese waters. Forbes also owned , which took the first cargo of ice to China. "During the Civil War he was employed as a volunteer by the government to inspect the building of nine gunboats and at the same time built for himself and others the Meteor, of 1500 tons."

The Sylph, yacht and pilot-boat, built in Boston in 1834 by Whitmore & Holbrook. was owned by Forbes. Her construction was overseen by Forbes.

Forbes rig
The clipper ship  was originally rigged with Forbes' double topsail yards.

The Forbes rig was also well received on Mermaid, as this 1852 excerpt from the "Boston Atlas" transcribed by Bruzelius shows:

Legacy
He built a Greek Revival mansion for his mother in Milton, Massachusetts, designed by Isaiah Rogers (1833), that is now the Captain Robert Bennet Forbes House Museum.

Forbes was awarded the medal of the Liverpool Shipwreck and Humane Society in 1849 for gallant conduct. The Cunard steamship Europa, on which Forbes was a passenger, ran down and sank an emigrant ship, Charles Bartlett. Forbes jumped from the bulwarks of the Europa into the water and rescued first a woman and child, and then a man.

In 1852 he was one of the founders and first president of the Sailors' Snug Harbor of Boston, a retirement home for "decrepit, infirm or aged sailors".

Writings
Forbes' writings, most of them pamphlets, include: 

On the Establishment of a Line of Mail Steamers ... to China (1855)
Remarks on Ocean Steam Navigation (1855)
The Forbes Rig (1862)
Means for Making the Highways of the Ocean more Safe (1867)
Remarks on Magnetism and Local Attraction (1875)

The Lifeboat and other Life-saving Inventions (1880)
New Rig for Steamers (1883)
Notes on Navigation (1884)
Loss of Life and Property in the Fisheries (1884)

References

External links
 Website of the Captain Forbes House Museum
 The Forbes and the Howe Rig, 1855
 Howe's Patent Rig
 Letter from R.B. Forbes to Captain Bradbury, ship N.B. Palmer'', New York, 1855
 A Letter from Geo. H. Bradbury to R.B. Forbes, 1855
 Forbes biography, Answers.com
 The Warship Of Peace That Fed Famine-Stricken Ireland

1804 births
1889 deaths
Robert Bennet Forbes
Writers from Boston
Businesspeople from Boston
19th-century American businesspeople
American consuls
American expatriates in China
Sea captains
American merchants
19th-century American diplomats
People from Jamaica Plain